Aethina is a genus of beetles belonging to the family Nitidulidae.

The genus has almost cosmopolitan distribution.

Species:

Aethina argus 
Aethina concinna 
Aethina concolor 
Aethina flavicollis 
Aethina inconspicua 
Aethina jelineki 
Aethina latens 
Aethina pubescens 
Aethina quadrata 
Aethina suturalis
Aethina tumida

References

Nitidulidae